Stanwix Rural is a civil parish in the Carlisle district of Cumbria, England.  It contains 63 listed buildings that are recorded in the National Heritage List for England.  Of these, three are listed at Grade II*, the middle of the three grades, and the others are at Grade II, the lowest grade.  The parish is to the northeast of the city of Carlisle, and contains the villages of Houghton, Low Crosby, High Crosby, Brunstock, Linstock, Tarraby, and Rickerby, and the surrounding countryside.  The oldest two listed buildings originated as tower houses, and have since been extended and altered.  Most of the listed buildings are country houses and smaller houses, some with associated structures, farmhouses and farm buildings.  The other listed buildings include churches, milestones, a public house, schools, a war memorial, and an isolated tower.


Key

Buildings

References

Citations

Sources

Lists of listed buildings in Cumbria